Revista INVI, until 2003 known as Boletín INVI, is an academic journal published by the Instituto de la Vivienda de la Facultad de Arquitectura y Urbanismo of the University of Chile. The subject of the journal is studies on urbanism, housing and territorial use.

External links 
 

Urban studies and planning journals
Urban planning in Chile
University of Chile academic journals
Publications established in 1986
Multilingual journals
1986 establishments in Chile
Open access journals
Triannual journals